The women's singles tennis event at the 2013 Summer Universiade was held from July 8 to 16, 2013 at the Tennis Academy in Kazan, Russia.

Seeds
All seeds receive a bye into the second round.

Draw

Finals

Top half

Section 1

Section 2

Section 3

Section 4

Bottom half

Section 5

Section 6

Section 7

Section 8

Consolation draw

Consolation finals
{{4TeamBracket-Tennis3
| RD1=Semifinals
| RD2=Final
| team-width=205

| RD1-seed1=1
| RD1-team1=
| RD1-score1-1=61
| RD1-score1-2=7
| RD1-score1-3=[10]
| RD1-seed2= 
| RD1-team2=
| RD1-score2-1=77
| RD1-score2-2=5
| RD1-score2-3=[5]
| RD1-seed3=3
| RD1-team3='''

Consolation main draw

Top half

Bottom half

References
 Main Draw
 Consolation Draw

External links
 2013 Summer Universiade – Tennis

2013